Kevin Walsh (born 1969) is a former Australian international lawn bowler.

Bowls career
Walsh made his Australian debut in 1996 and won the silver medal in the fours at the 1998 Commonwealth Games in Kuala Lumpur.

He won a silver medal in the fours at the 2004 World Outdoor Bowls Championship and announced his international retirement in 2005.

He won three medals at the Asia Pacific Bowls Championships, including a gold medal in the 2003 fours, in Brisbane.

References

Living people
1969 births
Australian male bowls players
Commonwealth Games medallists in lawn bowls
Commonwealth Games silver medallists for Australia
Bowls players at the 1998 Commonwealth Games
Medallists at the 1998 Commonwealth Games